The 1st Armor Brigade is one of the combined arms brigades of the Argentine Army.

Order of battle 
Reference

References 

Brigades of Argentina